Kazimierz Pułaski University of Technology and Humanities in Radom is a public university in Radom. It was the biggest university of the former Radom Voivodeship. The university was established in 1950 as a School of Engineering of General Technical Organization. For more than 50 years its name was often changed. The University of Technology and Humanities in Radom comprises 8 faculties, 4 of which are of technical profile: Faculty of Mechanical Engineering, Faculty of Transport and Electrical Engineering, Faculty of Materials Science, Technology and Design, and Faculty of Computer Science and Mathematics, whereas Faculty of Art, Faculty of Economics, Faculty of Philology and Pedagogics, and Faculty of Health Sciences and Physical Culture represent the Humanities. Students may choose from 27 degree courses (27 undergraduate and 12 graduate) and more than 100 specializations (majors). Many of them are unique in Poland.  The university also provides 6 doctoral programmes (economics, fine arts, transport, electrical engineering, mechanics and mechanical engineering and machine building ). The ECTS system is fully implemented and used in each Faculty. Thus, students of the university have the possibility to study abroad at different European universities within the 3 Erasmus Programme. The study period at a foreign university is fully recognized at the Technical University of Radom. The university also accept foreign students within the Erasmus Programme, too. Students can join students organizations, self-government, any of 36 student scientific associations, sports clubs and the horse-riding club.

Faculties and courses
Faculty of Materials Science, Technology and Designe
Chemical Technology (first- and second-cycle studies)
Production Management and Engineering (first-cycle studies)
Industrial Design (first-cycle studies)
Cosmetology (first-cycle studies)
Faculty of Mechanical Engineering
Mechanical Engineering and Machine Building  (first- and second-cycle studies)
Energy Technology (first-cycle studies)
Mechanics (third-cycle studies)
Building and Maintenance of Machines (third-cycle studies)
Faculty of Transport and Electrical Engineering
Transport (first- and second-cycle studies)
Electrical Engineering (first- and second-cycle studies)
Electronics and Telecommunication (first-cycle studies)
Tourism and Recreation (first-cycle studies)
Faculty of Economics
Economics (first- and second-cycle studies)
Administration (first- and second-cycle studies)
Materials Science (first- and second-cycle studies)
Faculty of Computer Science and Mathematics
Computer Science (first-cycle studies)
Mathematics (first- and second-cycle studies)
IT and Technical Education (first- and second-cycle studies)
Faculty of Art
Artistic Education in the Field of Fine Arts (first- and second-cycle studies)
Interior Design (first-cycle studies)
Printmaking (first-cycle studies)
Painting (first-cycle studies)
Faculty of Philology and Pedagogics
Polish studies (first-cycle studies)
English studies (first- and second-cycle studies)
German studies (first-cycle studies)
Pedagogy (first-cycle studies)
Faculty of Health Sciences and Physical Culture
Nursing (first-cycle studies and transition studies)
Physical therapy (first- and second-cycle studies)
Physical Education (first-cycle studies)
Medicine (long-cycle studies)

Academic authorities
Rector - Prof. Zbigniew Łukasik, Ph.D., D.S.
Vice-Rector for Didactics and Students - Prof. Mirosław Luft, Ph.D., D.S.
Vice-Rector for Research - Prof. Zbigniew Kosma, Ph.D., D.S.
Vice-Rector for Human Resources Development and International Cooperation - Prof. Sławomir Bukowski, Ph.D., D.S.
Chancellor - Mariusz Początek, M.S.
Vice-Chancellor - Queaestor (Chief Accountant) - Anna Towarek, M.A.

References